The 1891 Navy Midshipmen football team represented the United States Naval Academy during the 1891 college football season. The team compiled a 5–2 record and outscored its opponents 205 to 40. In the second installment of the Army–Navy Game, Army prevailed by a 32–16 score.  Charles Macklin was the Navy team captain in 1891.

Schedule

References

Navy
Navy Midshipmen football seasons
Navy Midshipmen football